We Are Rising is the second studio album by Ryan Lott under the Son Lux moniker. It was released through Anticon on June 28, 2011. The album was created as the RPM Challenge in February 2011.

Critical reception
Gregory Heaney of AllMusic gave the album 4 stars out of 5, stating that the most impressive thing about the album is "its seemingly effortless flow as it drifts from track to track, intuitively guiding listeners through its eerie sonic depths before gently depositing them at the end." Adam Kivel of Consequence of Sound gave the album a grade of B, calling it "a fully-fleshed, well-orchestrated electronic album."

Track listing

Personnel
Credits adapted from liner notes.

 Ryan Lott – performance, recording, mixing
 Rob Moose – acoustic guitar, violin
 Nadia Sirota – viola
 Clarice Jensen – cello
 Alex Sopp – flute, piccolo
 Hideaki Aomori – clarinet
 CJ Camerieri – trumpet
 Steven Temme – saxophone
 Judson Crane – celesta
 Ryan Fitch – drums
 Darren King – percussion
 McKenzie Smith – percussion
 DM Stith – vocals
 Katie Chastain – vocals
 Peter Silberman – vocals
 Jace Everett – vocals
 Shara Worden – vocals
 John McCaig – mastering
 Marke Johnson – art direction, design, photography
 Nathan Johnson – art direction, design, photography
 Brenden Beecy – portrait photography

References

Further reading

External links
 

2011 albums
Son Lux albums
Anticon albums